Waitara is a suburb in the Northern Sydney region, or Upper North Shore of Sydney, in the state of New South Wales, Australia 19 kilometres north-west of the Sydney central business district, in the local government area of Hornsby Shire.

History
Waitara is a word in the Maori language that means hail, pure water or hail, wide steps. (There is also a town in New Zealand named "Waitara".) The suburb takes its name from the Waitara River in New Zealand, where Australian troops fought as Imperial volunteers during the Maori Wars.

European settlement
Myles McRae once owned land in Southern Sydney, near Hurstville. When he sold that land to a development company, the manager used the name Waitara for the subdivision project. McCrae later bought land near Hornsby and when the railway station opened in 1895 he suggested the name Waitara, which was formally adopted.

Waitara Post Office opened on 1 October 1913 and closed in 1986. Waitara East Post Office opened on 1 June 1966 and closed in 1994.

Transport
Waitara railway station is on the North Shore & Western Line of the Sydney Trains network. It was originally known as Sandy Bank.

Commercial and community facilities
Waitara is a centre for all things automotive, car dealerships both new and used, car maintenance and smash repairers.

Waitara has just one hotel, the Blue Gum Hotel. There has been a hotel on the site since 1884, but two fires have destroyed the older buildings. The current building dates from 1962.
 
Waitara also has a Rugby League Club, called Asquith Rugby League Club, and a gym, called Millennium Health Club.

Police and Community Youth Clubs run a Performing Arts Centre in Edgeworth David Avenue (the latter is named after the scientist Edgeworth David).

Schools
 The public school is Waitara Public School, which has two O.C (opportunity class) classes. (Located in Wahroonga).
 The Catholic school is Our Lady of the Rosary Primary School. It was established in approximately 1918 and was located on the Pacific Highway opposite the railway station. It has since been relocated to Yardley Avenue.

Churches
 Our Lady of the Rosary Catholic Church was originally situated on the Pacific Highway opposite Hornsby railway station. It was later relocated to 27 Yardley Avenue. It has since become the cathedral church of the Roman Catholic Diocese of Broken Bay and is known as Our Lady of the Rosary Cathedral, Waitara. It is the namesake of the hymn tune Waitara.
 Waitara is home to a large Korean Catholic Community Church, which has produced the youth activity group WCKYS. The latter can be divided into three subgroups: Kerygma, J.O.Y. and Youth Legion of Mary. Kerygma group organises the youth mass, while J.O.Y. (Jesus Others and You) consists of teachers of Waitara Korean Sunday School.
 The Anglican Church of Waitara (All Saints) is located on the corner of Burdett Street and Palmerston Road. In addition to church services, there are a number of other events during the week including ESL classes, children's groups, youth groups and Bible studies.
 The Seventh-day Adventist Church, located at the corner of Park Avenue and Alexandria Parade, was established in 1903.

Population
The 2016 census community profile for Waitara revealed roughly equal proportions of men (48.0%) and women (52.0%) in a total population of 5,941. The median age of the Waitara population was 35 years of age, which was similar to the national median of 37. The most common ancestries in Waitara (State Suburbs) were Chinese 20.0%, English 12.3%, Indian 10.7%, Australian 9.1% and Iranian 5.0%. 33.1% of people were born in Australia. The next most common countries of birth were China 14.0%, India 10.4%, Iran 5.1%, South Korea 4.6% and Philippines 3.3%. 34.6% of people spoke only English at home. Other languages spoken at home included Mandarin 14.5%, Cantonese 5.9%, Korean 5.7%, Persian 5.5% and Hindi 3.8%.The average household had 2.4 people.  The most common responses for religion were No Religion 32.5%, Catholic 16.3% and Hinduism 13.1%.

References

External links

  [CC-By-SA]

Suburbs of Sydney
Hornsby Shire